Drepanoblemma is a genus of moths of the family Erebidae. The genus was erected by George Hampson in 1926.

Species
Drepanoblemma incurvata Schaus, 1901
Drepanoblemma partita Walker, 1865

References

Calpinae